Friedrich Bernhard Karl Gustav Ulrich Erich Graf von der Schulenburg (21 November 1865 in Bobitz - 19 May 1939 in St. Blasien) was a Prussian General during World War I and a member of the Nazi Party during the inter-war period.

Life 
Friedrich Graf von der Schulenburg was born on 21 November 1865 as the second son of Count Werner von der Schulenburg (1832-1880) and his wife, Countess Marie Cäcilie von Maltzahn (1843-1900). Schulenburg entered the army in 1888 as part of the 2nd Guards Uhlans. On 13 December 1888, Schulenburg was appointed Second Lieutenant. In 1890, Schulenburg was attached to the Life Guards. He spent time in the Prussian Staff College. In 1895, Schulenburg became Premier Lieutenant. In 1900, Schulenburg joined the German General Staff. He was considered a capable general staff officer. In 1900, Schulenburg became Hauptmann. From 1902 to 1906 he was part of the military attaches in London. In 1907, Schulenburg was promoted to Major. On 18 February 1913, Schulenburg became the commander of the Life Guards and Aide-de-camp of Wilhelm II. On 2 September 1913, Schulenburg was promoted to Oberstlieutenant.

At the outbreak of World War I, Schulenburg became the Chief of Staff of the Guards Corps commanded by Karl von Plettenberg. Schulenburg participated on the Western Front as part of the Guard Corps, which is part of the 2nd Army. In 1915, Schulenburg became Oberst. In 1916, Schulenburg became the Chief of Staff of the 5th Army replacing Konstantin Schmidt von Knobelsdorf, who held extremist political views. For a while, Schulenburg was the Chief of Staff of the 6th Army of Ludwig von Falkenhausen. In October 1916, he joined Crown Prince Wilhelm as Chief of Staff at the headquarters of the Army Group German Crown Prince. The two developed Operation Alberich which gave Germany some hope of winning the war. On 12 April 1917, Schulenburg received the Pour le Mérite. He added oak leaves on 23 March 1918. In June 1918, Schulenburg became General Major. Schulenburg advised Wilhelm II to abdicate his title of German Emperor but keep the title of King of Prussia. He also advised Wilhelm II to order the army to fight against the revolutionary forces.

After the war, Schulenburg retired from the army in May 1919. He lived in his estate, Mecklenburg. Schulenburg later joined the Nazi Party. From 1924 to 1928, he was a member of the Reichstag. He still remained friendly with Wilhelm, German Crown Prince and had some profound political conversation. In December 1931, Schulenburg joined the Nazi Party. His number was  852,947. In 1933, Schulenburg joined Sturmabteilung. After the Weimar Republic fell, Schulenburg was a member of Reichstag again. Since he had a good relationship with Kurt von Schleicher, he advised Hitler as liaison to the Reichswehr but he was not effective. From 1934 to 1936, Schulenburg was part of the Sturmabteilung as a staff officer. He also served as a member of the Reichstag from 1934 until his death. Before his death, Schulenburg was promoted to Obergruppenführer. He died on 19 May 1939. Adolf Hitler attended his funeral to meet with Fritz-Dietlof von der Schulenburg, Schulenburg's son, who later joined the resistance.

Family 
On 21 July 1897, Schulenburg married Freda-Marie Gräfin von Arnim (1873-1939). They had 6 children:

 Johann Albrecht (1898–1944)
 Wolf-Werner (1899–1944), SA-Brigadeführer
 Adolf-Heinrich (1901-1940) SA-Obersturmführer
 Fritz-Dietlof (1902-1944)
 Elisabeth (1903–2001)
 Wilhelm (1904–1936)

Awards 
The following are the orders that Von der Schulenburg received:

German States 

 Order of the Crown 3rd Class
 Order of Saint John
 Service award
 Order of the Red Eagle 2nd Class
 Pour le Mérite with Oak Leaves
 Iron Cross (1914) 1st and 2nd Class

Nazi Germany 

 Golden Party Badge on 1 April 1938

References 

1865 births
1939 deaths
Recipients of the Iron Cross (1914), 1st class
Recipients of the Iron Cross (1914), 2nd class
Recipients of the Pour le Mérite (military class)
German Army generals of World War I
Major generals of Prussia
Nobility in the Nazi Party
Counts of Germany
SS-Obergruppenführer
Military personnel from Mecklenburg-Western Pomerania
Members of the Reichstag of the Weimar Republic
Members of the Reichstag of Nazi Germany
Nazi Party politicians
Schulenburg family